Yadira Toraya Guerrero (born 8 November 1991) is an American-born Mexican footballer who plays as a central defense for Liga MX Femenil side club Tijuana.

Early life 
Toraya was born in California and attended Pacifica High School in Oxnard, California. She attended High School from 2006-2009 and played 3 years of varsity Soccer. Throughout her high school career, she played in a total of 68 games, scored 59 goals and had 28 assists. She graduated from Pacifica High School in 2009.

Playing career

College
Toraya started her college career at Ventura College in 2009. During her time at Ventura, she was named First Team all-Conference and Western State Conference Champion in 2010.

In 2011, Toraya transferred to Kansas Wesleyan University. During her time at KWU, she earned several recognitions. She was named KCAC First Team All Region and All- American Selections in back-to-back years She was also named the KCAC Defensive Player of the year and was a KCAC Conference Champion and Tournament Champion.

Houston Dash 
In 2015, Toraya played in the pre-Season for the Houston Dash in the Women’s national Soccer League.

Santa Clarita Blue Heat 
In 2016, Toraya joined the Santa Clarita Blue Heat, a semi-professional team in the United Women’s Soccer League. She helped the Blue Heat win the Conference and National Championship. During her time with the Santa Clarita Blue Heat, she was named to the All UWS “Starting 11” First Team.

Club Tijuana 
On 22 July 2019, Toraya debuted for Club Tijuana from Liga MX Femenil. Her first game was against Tiburones Rojos de Veracruz. She is currently on the Roster for the rest of the 2019 Season

International career 
In 2015, Toraya played her first match with the Mexico women's national football team, where she suited up and played against the United States on 17 May 2015 in an international friendly.

Toraya was named the first Alternate for the 2015 Mexican woman’s world cup squad. She was invited to join the Mexican Woman’s National Team for the Pan-american Games held in Toronto after the World Cup.

Coaching career 
Toraya was an assistant girls' soccer coach for Pacifica High School. She helped coach the team to multiple CIF playoff appearances.

Toraya was hired to the KWU Woman’s Soccer Coaching Staff as an Assistant Coach for the 2017 Season.

References

External links 
 

1991 births
Living people
Citizens of Mexico through descent
Mexican women's footballers
Women's association football midfielders
Club Tijuana (women) footballers
Liga MX Femenil players
American women's soccer players
Soccer players from California
Sportspeople from Oxnard, California
American sportspeople of Mexican descent
College women's soccer players in the United States
Kansas Wesleyan University alumni